Uxegney is a commune in the Vosges department in Grand Est in northeastern France.

See also
Communes of the Vosges department
Fort d'Uxegney

References

External links

Le fort d'Uxegney sur www.fortiffsere.fr http://fortiffsere.fr/epinalgauche/index_fichiers/Page3320.htm
Official site

Communes of Vosges (department)